Zahradníček is a Czech-language surname. It means "little gardener" in English.

Some notable people with the surname include:
 Jan Zahradníček (1905–1960), Czech poet
 Tomáš Zahradníček (born 1993), Czech footballer

Czech-language surnames
Occupational surnames